Jaime Arturo Vázquez Aguilar (born 7 May 1975) is a Mexican politician formerly from the New Alliance Party. From 2009 to 2012 he served as Deputy of the LXI Legislature of the Mexican Congress representing the State of Mexico.

References

1975 births
Living people
Politicians from the State of Mexico
New Alliance Party (Mexico) politicians
21st-century Mexican politicians
Deputies of the LXI Legislature of Mexico
Members of the Chamber of Deputies (Mexico) for the State of Mexico